Sikander Zulfiqar (born 28 March 1997) is a Dutch cricketer. He made his Twenty20 International debut against the United Arab Emirates on 3 February 2016. He made his first-class debut for the Netherlands against Hong Kong in the 2015–17 ICC Intercontinental Cup tournament on 10 February 2017. He made his List A debut for the Netherlands against Zimbabwe on 20 June 2017.

On 17 July 2017, he played in the same match with his brothers Asad and Saqib, when they faced the United Arab Emirates at the VRA Cricket Ground, Amstelveen. It was the first instance of triplets playing for a professional cricket team in the same game.

In July 2019, he was selected to play for the Amsterdam Knights in the inaugural edition of the Euro T20 Slam cricket tournament. However, the following month the tournament was cancelled. In April 2020, he was one of seventeen Dutch-based cricketers to be named in the team's senior squad.

References

External links
 

1997 births
Living people
Dutch cricketers
Netherlands Twenty20 International cricketers
Place of birth missing (living people)
Dutch people of Pakistani descent
Sportspeople of Pakistani descent
Triplets